The 1907 United States House of Representatives elections in Oklahoma were held on September 17, 1907 to elect the five U.S. representatives from the state of Oklahoma, which was set to be admitted to the Union on November 16, 1907. Members were elected to short terms that would last the remainder of the 60th Congress.

Upon statehood, Oklahoma was delegated five congressional districts, which were held by four Democratic representatives and one Republican.

Overview

District 1

District 2

District 3

District 4

District 5

See also 
 1907 United States Senate elections in Oklahoma
 1907 Oklahoma gubernatorial election

References 

1907
Oklahoma
United States House of Representatives